The 2008 Individual Speedway Junior Polish Championship (MIMP) is the 2008 version of Individual Speedway Junior Polish Championship organized by the Polish Motor Union (PZM).

The Final took place on August 19, 2008, in Rybnik. The last time the Final took place in Leszno in the 2003 season, with Łukasz Romanek beating Adrian Miedziński and Zbigniew Czerwiński.

Calendar

Semi-finals

Final

Day 1 (canceled) 
Final
2008-08-15 (6:00)
 Rybnik, Municipal Stadium
Referee: Ryszard Bryła
Attendance: ?
Beat Time: ?

Heat after heat:
 Szczepaniak, Gomólski, Kajoch, Miturski
 Janowski, Pawlaszczyk, Mitko, Łopaczewski
 Jędrzejewski, Brzozowski, Zengota, Pawlicki
 Mroczka, Szewczykowski, Kasprzak, Szostek

The Final was canceled, because was rain.

Day 2 

Final
2008-08-19 (6:00)
 Rybnik, Municipal Stadium
Referee: Ryszard Bryła
Attendance:
Beat Time:

References 

Individual Junior